Royal Bank Zimbabwe, commonly referred to as Royal Bank, was a licensed commercial bank in that formerly operated in Zimbabwe.  It operated between 2001 and 2012, when it was shutdown by its Board due to accumulated losses, liquidity challenges and high level of non-performing loans.

Royal Bank was a small privately owned financial institution and financial services provider in Zimbabwe. , the shareholder's equity in the bank was estimated at about US$12.5 million, the minimum capital requirement for a commercial bank in Zimbabwe.

History
The bank was founded in 2001. In 2004, the Reserve Bank of Zimbabwe (RBZ), the national banking regulator, closed the bank down, together with Barbican Bank and Trust Banking Corporation. The assets of the three shuttered banks, were merged, to form Zimbabwe Allied Banking Group (ZABG).

In September 2010, the RBZ reversed its decision and reissued the commercial banking licences of the three banks that had been closed. Royal Bank reopened in February 2011, after six years of enforced closure. ZABG also retained its banking licence. , the number of licensed commercial banks in Zimbabwe, was nineteen.

In March 2012, Zimbabwean media reported that Commercial Bank of Africa Group, a Kenyan financial services conglomerate, had agreed to acquire a 62% stake in Royal Bank of Zimbabwe. However, both parties failed to finalise on the deal within the allowed regulatory time frame thus the deal lapsed.

Closure and liquidation
On July 27, 2012, the board of directors of Royal Bank Zimbabwe resolved to surrender the institution's banking licence to the Reserve Bank of Zimbabwe and shut down its business in the country. This followed the determination by the Reserve Bank of Zimbabwe that Royal Bank was no longer in a "safe and sound financial condition". The board of directors' resolution was due to under capitalization of the bank, accumulated of losses, liquidity challenges and high level of non-performing loans. The central bank is in the process of liquidating Royal bank and reimbursing depositor funds.

Branch network
, Royal Bank maintained a network of branches at the following locations:

 Main Branch - 8th Floor Takura House, 67 Kwame Nkrumah Avenue, Harare 
 Karoi Branch - 9 Harris Street, Karoi
 Gwanda Branch - 6 Fourth Avenue & Lawley Street, Gwanda
 Nyanga Branch - 18 Rochdale Road, Nyanga
 Chegutu Branch - 110 Queen Street, Chegutu
 Lobengula Branch - 9 & 10 Lobengula Mall, 6th Avenue Extension, Bulawayo
 Hwange Branch - Coronation Drive, Hwange
 Rusape Branch - 13 Robert Mugabe Street, Rusape
 Kadoma Branch - 156 Herbert Chitepo Street & Mukwati Street, Kadoma
 Ascot Branch - Shop 7 Ascot Complex, Bulawayo
 Chipinge Branch - 75 Main Street, Chipinge
 Marondera Branch - 253 Shop 2, The Green, Marondera
 Kwekwe Branch - 35 North Mandela Way at 3rd Street, Kwekwe

See also
 List of banks in Zimbabwe
 Reserve Bank of Zimbabwe
 Economy of Zimbabwe

References

External links
Website of Reserve Bank of Zimbabwe
Website of Royal Bank Zimbabwe
Royal Bank Strikes US$20 Million Deal With Core Investor

Banks of Zimbabwe
Banks established in 2001
2001 establishments in Zimbabwe
Companies based in Harare